Britt Township is one of sixteen townships in Hancock County, Iowa, US.  As of the 2000 census, its population was 2,293.

History
Britt Township was founded in 1873.

Geography
According to the United States Census Bureau, Britt Township covers an area of 35.44 square miles (91.79 square kilometers); of this, 35.11 square miles (90.94 square kilometers, 99.07 percent) is land and 0.33 square miles (0.85 square kilometers, 0.93 percent) is water.

Cities, towns, villages
 Britt

Adjacent townships
 Crystal Township (north)
 Madison Township (northeast)
 Garfield Township (east)
 Liberty Township (southeast)
 Erin Township (south)
 Boone Township (southwest)
 Orthel Township (west)
 Bingham Township (northwest)

Cemeteries
The township contains Evergreen Cemetery.

Major highways
  U.S. Route 18
  Iowa Highway 111

Landmarks
 Eagle Lake State Park

School districts
 Garner-Hayfield-Ventura Community School District
 West Hancock Community School District

Political districts
 Iowa's 4th congressional district
 State House District 11
 State Senate District 6

References
 United States Census Bureau 2008 TIGER/Line Shapefiles
 United States Board on Geographic Names (GNIS)
 United States National Atlas

External links
 US-Counties.com
 City-Data.com

Townships in Hancock County, Iowa
Townships in Iowa